The Wran ministry (1981–1983) or Fourth Wran ministry was the 74th ministry of the New South Wales Government, and was led by the 35th Premier of New South Wales, Neville Wran, representing the Labor Party. It was the fourth of eight consecutive occasions when Wran was Premier.

Background
Wran had been elected to the Legislative Council of New South Wales by a joint sitting of the New South Wales Parliament on 12 March 1970. He was Leader of the Opposition in the Legislative Council from 22 February 1972. He resigned from the council on 19 October 1973 to switch to the Legislative Assembly, successfully contesting the election for Bass Hill, which he would hold until his retirement in 1986. Wran successfully challenged Pat Hills to become Leader of Labor Party and Leader of the Opposition from 3 December 1973 and became Premier following a narrow one seat victory at the 1976 election.

Labor retained government at the 1981 election, gaining an additional 6 seats despite a 2% swing against Labor, giving a majority of 19 seats in the Legislative Assembly and two seats in the Legislative Council.

Composition of ministry
The ministry covers the period from 2 October 1981. There was a slight rearrangement in May 1982 that altered the titles of two ministers. The ministry ended on 1 February 1983, when Wran reconfigured his ministry, and the Fifth Wran ministry was formed.

 
Ministers are members of the Legislative Assembly unless otherwise noted.

See also

Members of the New South Wales Legislative Assembly, 1981–1984
Members of the New South Wales Legislative Council, 1981–1984

Notes

References

 

New South Wales ministries
1981 establishments in Australia
1983 disestablishments in Australia
Australian Labor Party ministries in New South Wales